1993-01-27 The Flood Zone, Richmond, VA is a live album by Dave Matthews Band, and is the tenth volume in the band's DMBlive series of download-only concert recordings. (The releases are not given unique album titles.) The album was recorded at The Flood Zone in Richmond, Virginia, on January 27, 1993. It is notable for being the first official release to include original DMB keyboardist Peter Griesar. It is also the first official release of the song "Spotlight". Dave Matthews has previously noted his distaste for that song.

Track listing

References

Dave Matthews Band live albums
2009 live albums
Self-released albums